is a tokusatsu superhero film series that serves as crossovers between Toei Company's superhero productions.

In the run-up to the first film, producer Shinichiro Shirakura said he would like to make this type of movie the norm for spring films.

Currently all five movies have been written by Shoji Yonemura. For the directors, the first two films are directed by Osamu Kaneda, the third and fourth were directed by Takayuki Shibasaki and the fifth was again directed by Osamu Kaneda.

Following the production of short films named "Net Movies" to accompany the release of OOO, Den-O, All Riders: Let's Go Kamen Riders on 2011, both Super Hero Taisen and Super Hero Taisen Z had their own series of Net Movies, Super Hero Taihen: Who Is the Culprit? and Super Hero Taisen Otsu!: Heroo! Answers respectively. While a tradition for the Kamen Rider summer movies since Kamen Rider Kiva, these Net Movies featured a new chance for Super Sentai characters to participate following their own attempt at Engine Sentai Go-onger: Boom Boom! Bang Bang! GekijōBang!! alongside Kiva failing to start the tradition for their own summer movies. However, a series of Net Movies were not made to accompany Kamen Rider Taisen.

Since their beginning, the franchise releases a film, at the very most, two weeks after their magical girl counterpart Pretty Cure All Stars.

Films

External links
 

Crossover tokusatsu films
Japanese film series
Japanese superhero films
Kamen Rider films
Metal Hero films
Super Sentai films
Toei tokusatsu
Toei tokusatsu films